Nassim al-Roh (Breeze of the Soul) is a Syrian drama film by director Abdellatif Abdelhamid. The film discusses different social scenes in modern Syrian society.

References

External links
 

1998 films
1990s Arabic-language films
Films directed by Abdellatif Abdelhamid
Syrian drama films